The Order of the Pioneers of Liberia or more formally Grand Order of the Most Venerable Order of the Knighthood of the Pioneers of the Republic of Liberia is an order presented by the government of Liberia.  The order may be presented to Liberian or foreign citizens for outstanding and distinguished service in international affairs, government, religion, art, science or commerce, and also for singular acts of philanthropy and deeds of heroism and valor.

Classes
The Order is presented in the following five classes:
Grand Cordon
Knight Commander
Commander
Officer
Knight

Recipients
Bravid W. Harris 
Goodluck Jonathan 
John Kufuor
Pat Nixon
Hifikepunye Pohamba

References

Orders, decorations, and medals of Liberia
Awards established in 1955
1955 establishments in Africa